Hocine Rouibah Stadium, is a multi-use stadium in Jijel, Algeria.  It is currently used mostly for football matches.  The stadium holds 30,000 people. It serves as a home ground for JS Djijel.

References

Rouibah Hocine
Buildings and structures in Jijel Province